Linas and Simona was a duo, which represented Lithuania in the Eurovision Song Contest 2004. With 26 points they placed 16th in the semifinal and could not participate in the final. However, they befriended Ruslana, the winner of the Eurovision 2004, and together recorded Fight for Love and Freedom.

This song was released in album I Love U on 22 July 2005. In 2005 they were representatives of an anti-AIDS campaign in Lithuania. The couple separated in late 2007 ending the duo. Their last work, live album Linas and Simona presents UAB MUSIC Live featuring Stasys Povilaitis, Violeta Riaubiškytė, was released in February 2008.

Members
 Linas Adomaitis was born on 10 April 1976 to a family of a professional violinist. He attended music school from early age and now holds a master's degree from the Lithuanian Academy of Music and Theater. Linas started his music career in 1995 with quartet called L+. The band played in R&B style. They released four albums before adjourning in 2000. Linas then started solo career.
 Simona Jakubėnaitė (born in 1984) participated in about 15 large international music festivals before taking part in Fizz Superstar contest in 2002. The show was very similar to the American Idol and took place in the three Baltic states. Simona did not win the contest, but met Linas and started working together. For a while she was Linas' backing singer. After the separation from Linas, she went to study at the Berklee College of Music.

References

Eurovision Song Contest entrants for Lithuania
Eurovision Song Contest entrants of 2004
Lithuanian pop music groups
Lithuanian Academy of Music and Theatre alumni